The Beech Street Brick Street is an historic section of the Beech Street roadway in Texarkana, Arkansas. It consists of a section of road, between 14th and 24th Streets, which was paved in brick c. 1904. The bricks, which measure , are laid in a running bond pattern. The road section is a rare surviving example of the use of brick as a paving material, as most such roads have since been paved over with asphalt.

The road section was listed on the National Register of Historic Places in 2007. It contributes to the historic significance of the Beech Street Historic District, which includes the residential properties on Beech Street and some adjacent roads.

See also

National Register of Historic Places listings in Miller County, Arkansas

References

Roads on the National Register of Historic Places in Arkansas
Transportation in Miller County, Arkansas
Roads in Arkansas
Individually listed contributing properties to historic districts on the National Register in Arkansas
National Register of Historic Places in Miller County, Arkansas